Gordy Gurson (born May 2, 1992, in Park Ridge, Illinois) is an American professional soccer player who currently plays for Utica City FC in the Major Arena Soccer League.

Early life and education
Gurson was raised in the Chicago suburb of Buffalo Grove, Illinois. He attended Stevenson High School where he was named to the All-State team in 2009. He spent his freshman year of college at the University of Memphis then the next three years at Robert Morris University Illinois where he was a three-time All-American.

Pro career 
Gurson began his professional career playing for Chicago in the National Soccer League, where he received the Golden Boot Award with 40 scored goals in 17 played games. After playing for one season for Chicago, Gurson signed with the Seattle Impact of the Major Arena Soccer League prior to the team's inaugural season. Mid-season, he was traded to the St. Louis Ambush. Gurson was selected for the 2014-15 MASL All-League Second Team and named to the league's 2014–15 all-rookie team. On March 13, 2015, the MASL announced the finalists for its major year-end awards, including Gurson as a nominee for Rookie of the Year. Gurson received the rookie of the year award honor as well as a call up to the USA national indoor soccer team that won the World Cup in March 2015. Gurson had 1 goal and 1 assist in 6 appearances for Team USA. In 2017/2018 MASL season Gurson broke the single season point record for Cedar Rapids with 49 points. Also was named to All MASL 3rd team.  When the Cedar Rapids team moved to Orlando, Florida in 2018 to become the Orlando SeaWolves, Gurson moved with them.

After leading Orlando in points with 17 goals and 8 assists, Gurson joined the SeaWolves' in-state MASL rivals Florida Tropics SC. Though he would injure himself and later be released, Gurson would register 12 points in eleven games, helping the Tropics win the MASL Eastern Conference Regular Season Championship during the COVID-19 shortened season. 

Gurson returned to Cedar Rapids in 2020, signing to play outdoors with a newly-formed club, Iowa Raptors FC.

In October 2021, Gurson signed with the Milwaukee Wave.

In May 2022, the Iowa Raptors announced they would be joining Major Arena Soccer League 2 with Gurson as their general manager.

References

External links
MASL player profile

Living people
1992 births
Major Arena Soccer League players
Memphis Tigers men's soccer players
National Soccer League (Chicago) players
People from Buffalo Grove, Illinois
Robert Morris Colonials men's soccer players
Soccer players from Illinois
Sportspeople from Park Ridge, Illinois
St. Louis Ambush (1992–2000) players
Association football forwards
Seattle Impact
Orlando SeaWolves players
American expatriate soccer players
American expatriate sportspeople in Australia
Expatriate soccer players in Australia
Florida Tropics SC players
United Premier Soccer League players
American expatriate sportspeople in Mexico
Expatriate footballers in Mexico
American soccer players
San Diego Sockers players
Milwaukee Wave players
Iowa Raptors FC players
Utica City FC players